The 5. Pluk špeciálneho určenia, 5. PŠU (literally 5th Special Purpose Regiment) is based in Žilina, and serves as the Slovak Armed Forces primary counter-terrorism and special operations unit. The unit is the main component of the newly created Special Operiations Forces (SK SOCOM).

It has a strength of over 450 personnel, organized into a command and staff section, medical section, and seven detachments: three special purpose detachments, one special signal detachment, one intelligence support detachment, one combat support detachment and a training detachment. Each special purpose detachment has four ten-man teams composed of two officers, two medics, a radio operator, two snipers, an engineer, an operator, and a technician. These teams will then be specialized in special reconnaissance, Direct Action, communications, medicine, or demolitions/heavy weapons. The combat support detachment has a section of 9 snipers, a combat diver section, and an anti-tank section equipped with anti-tank missiles.

The 5. PŠU regularly trains with western special operations units, including the US Army's 10th Special Forces Group and the French 1er RPIMa. Since the unit's creation in 1994, 5. Pluk špeciálneho určenia has increasingly adopted western special forces techniques and equipment, and has, in recent years, been a participant in the EUFOR Althea, and since 2011 within ISAF War in Afghanistan (2001–present).

Weapons
 Glock 17
 M4 carbine
 Heckler & Koch MP5
 Heckler & Koch UMP
 Heckler & Koch HK416
 Heckler & Koch G36
 FN Minimi
 Barrett M82
 M2 Browning
 M320 Grenade Launcher Module

Vehicles
 Iveco LMV 10
 HMMWV 3+
 International MaxxPro 2+
Polaris MRZR

Links
 5. PŠU WWW site
 5. PŠU presentation
 5. PŠU unofficial site

Special forces of Slovakia
Military units and formations of Slovakia
Žilina